The Uganda national badminton team represents Uganda in international badminton team competitions. It is controlled by the Uganda Badminton Association, the governing body for Ugandan badminton located in Kampala. 

Uganda has never competed in the Thomas Cup, the Uber Cup and the Sudirman Cup. Uganda made its Olympic badminton debut in the 2008 Summer Olympics when Edwin Ekiring received a wildcard entry to participate.

Participation in African Badminton Championships
The Ugandan women's team were runners-up once in the All Africa Women's Team Badminton Championships. The mixed team were semifinalists in the 2021 African Badminton Championships mixed team event.

The men's team's best result was achieving a quarterfinal position 2010 All Africa Men's Team Badminton Championships.

Men's team

Women's team

Mixed team

Participation in Africa Games

List of medalists

Current squad 

Men
Brian Kasirye
Paul Makande
Friday Attaman
Amos Muyanja
Kenneth Comfort Mwambu
Israel Wanagalya

Women
Brenda Awor
Husina Kobugabe
Fadilah Mohamed Rafi
Tracy Naluwooza
Rajab Shamsa Mbira
Sharifah Wanyana

References

Badminton
National badminton teams
Badminton in Uganda